AztecCormorant is the third full-length studio album by London-based composer/producer Matthew Gilbert Linley, and was released in January 2014 under the same project name. The tracks 'And Lo' and 'In Serenades' were featured on Tom Robinson's July and November 2014 BBC 6 Music Mixtapes.

Track listing

Personnel

Musicians
Matthew Gilbert Linley: Synths, organs, celeste and piano, drums and percussion.
Maud Waret: Vocals. 
Roger Linley: Double bass, bass guitar. 
Brian Lee: Violin, spoken word on 9.
Geoff Irwin: Viola.
Masumi Yamamoto: Harpsichord.
Anna Drysdale: French horn.
Feargal Murray: Vocals on 9.

Production
Recorded and produced by Matthew Gilbert Linley in London, except:
Drums recorded at Tileyard Studios by Nikolaj Bjerre.
Mixed in London by Mark Peters of Engineers.
Mastered by Duncan Cowell at Sound Mastering London.

References

External links
 AztecCormorant Soundcloud page
 Engineers' Facebook page
 BBC Website Artist Page

2014 albums